Richard Riakporhe (born 5 January 1990) is a professional boxer who held the British cruiserweight title from 2019 to 2020.

Early life
Born on 5 January 1990, Richard Riakporhe grew up on the Aylesbury Estate in Walworth, London. At the age of 15, he was stabbed in the chest outside a house party, requiring emergency surgery to drain his lungs of blood. Riakporhe had a late start to boxing; first stepping into a gym, the Lynn ABC, at the age of 19. Alongside boxing as an amateur he continued in pursuit of further education, studying at college and eventually moving on to Kingston University in south west London, earning a degree in marketing communications and advertising in 2015.

Professional career
Riakporhe made his professional debut on 6 August 2016, scoring a four-round points decision (PTS) victory over Jason Jones at the York Hall in London. Following a second win in 2016 – a technical knockout (TKO) over Aaron Lacy in October – he scored three consecutive TKO victories in 2017; against Istvan Orsos in February; Milan Cechvala in May; and Jiri Svacina in October.

He began 2018 with a TKO victory over Adam Williams in March, followed by a win via corner retirement (RTD) against Elvis Dube in July. Riakporhe's final fight of 2018 was against Sam Hyde on 10 November at the Manchester Arena, with the vacant WBA Inter-Continental cruiserweight title on the line. Riakporhe won via eighth-round TKO after Hyde's trainer, Joe Gallagher, threw in the towel after Hyde sustained an eye injury from a right hook. Riakporhe was behind on all three judges' scorecards at the time of the stoppage, with two judges scoring the bout 68–65 while the third scored it 67–66. The fight was televised live on Sky Sports Box Office in the United Kingdom and streamed through DAZN in the United States as part of the undercard of Oleksandr Usyk vs. Tony Bellew.

The first defence of his WBA title came on 2 March 2019 against Tommy McCarthy at the East of England Arena in Peterborough. Riakporhe dropped his opponent twice en route to a fourth-round TKO. He defended the title for a second time against Chris Billam-Smith on 20 July at The O2 Arena, London. Riakporhe won by split decision (SD), with two judges scoring the bout in favour of Riakporhe at 97–92 and 95–94, while the third scored it to Smith at 96–93. The fight was televised live on Sky Sports Box Office in the United Kingdom and streamed through DAZN in the United States as part of the undercard for Dillian Whyte vs. Óscar Rivas. Riakporhe was scheduled to face Jack Massey on 19 December 2019 for the vacant British cruiserweight title. He won the fight by unanimous decision, with scores of 115-113, 115-113 and 117-111.

Riakporhe returned from a near two-year layoff to face Krzysztof Twardowski on 2 October 2021 in his first non-title bout since 28 July 2018. He won the fight by unanimous decision, with all three judges scoring the fight 79-72. A month later, Riakporhe beat Olanrewaju Durodola by a fifth-round technical knockout to capture the vacant WBC Silver cruiserweight title.

Riakporhe was booked to face Fabio Turchi on 26 March 2022, in the main event of a BOXXER Fight Night card which will take place at the Wembley Arena in London, England. Turchi withdrew from the bout on 9 March, due to injuries sustained in training, and was replace by Deion Jumah. He won the fight by knockout, flooring Jumah with a right straight to the body early in the eight round. Riakporhe faced Turchi on the 11 June 2022, once again as the main event of a BOXXER card. Riakporhe extended his unbeaten record again in an IBF world title eliminator, flooring Turchi in the second with a body shot. Turchi rose to his feet after the eight count, but, with Turchi being visibly hurt, his corner threw in the towel. Referee Steve Gray stopped the fight 1:53 into the round.

Riakporhe faced the former two-time WBO cruiserweight world champion Krzysztof Głowacki on 21 January 2023 (on the undercard of Chris Eubank Jr. vs Liam Smith). He won the fight by a fourth-round technical knockout.

Outside of boxing
Drawing from his experiences of a troubled upbringing, Riakporhe set up a company, Richard Riakporhe Foundation, which focuses on talking to schoolchildren on positive thinking and the dangers of knife crime. Riakporhe is a supporter of Crystal Palace f.c<ref>{{cite news|url=https://www.cpfc.co.uk/news/programme/how-palace-fan-richard-riakporhe-overcame-stabbing-to-become-cruiserweight-champion-boxer/2020-09-22/ |title=How Palace fan Richard Riakporhe overcame stabbing to become cruiserweight champion boxer.

Professional boxing record

References

External links
Official website

Living people
1990 births
English male boxers
Boxers from Greater London
Cruiserweight boxers